Romain Attanasio is a French sailor born on 26 June 1977 in Hautes-Alpes and now resides in Trégunc. He is the winner of the RORC Caribbean 600 race in 2015, he competed in the 2016–2017 Vendée Globe and 2020–2021 Vendée Globe where he finished 15th and 14th respectively. He is engaged to fellow professional offshore sailor Samantha Davies whom he has a son Ruben.

Results highlights

References

External links
 Vendee Campaign Website

1977 births
Living people
Sportspeople from Saint-Malo
French male sailors (sport)
Class 40 class sailors
IMOCA 60 class sailors
French Vendee Globe sailors
2016 Vendee Globe sailors
2020 Vendee Globe sailors
Vendée Globe finishers
Single-handed circumnavigating sailors
21st-century French people